Saula is a village in Kose Parish, Harju County in northern Estonia.

Saula is the location of Viking Village, a viking-themed theme park.

See also
 Saula Blue Springs

References

External links
 Viking Village

Villages in Harju County